Parklands is a rural locality in the Sunshine Coast Region, Queensland, Australia. Parklands is located adjacent to and north of the larger town of Nambour.

Geography 
The suburb is bisected by the Bruce Highway.  A large section of bushland in eastern Parklands, called the Parklands Conservation Park, has been set aside for recreational use and is very popular for mountainbiking, with a number of defined and marked trails.  15 km of tracks are open to the public during daylight hours.  Camping is not permitted in the park.

Nambour Golf Course is located in the south of the Parklands.

Amenities 
The Sunshine Coast Regional Council operates a mobile library service which visits Village Way.

References

Suburbs of the Sunshine Coast Region
Localities in Queensland